Jeremy Miles MS is a Welsh Labour and Co-operative Party politician, serving as Minister for Education and Minister for the Welsh Language in the Welsh Government since 2021. Miles has been the Member of the Senedd (MS) for Neath since 2016. He previously served in the Welsh Government as Counsel General for Wales from 2017 to 2021, Brexit Minister from 2018 to 2021, and the Minister for coordinating Wales’ recovery from the COVID-19 pandemic from 2020 to 2021.

Early life
He was born and brought up in Pontarddulais near Swansea, south Wales and, as a native Welsh speaker, was educated at a bilingual comprehensive school – Ysgol Gyfun Ystalyfera in the Swansea Valley. He graduated from New College, Oxford University, where he read law. After graduating, he taught law at the Centre for English Legal Studies, Warsaw University.

He returned to the UK and practised as a solicitor in London initially, and then held senior legal and commercial posts in media sector businesses including ITV and with the US television network and film studio, NBC Universal, based in London.

He stood unsuccessfully as the Labour candidate in the safe Conservative seat of Beaconsfield at the 2010 general election. Miles also stood in the Labour selection for Aberavon in 2014, losing the selection to Stephen Kinnock by one vote.

After returning to live in South Wales, he set up his own business affairs consultancy, working with international clients in the broadcast and digital sectors.

Political career

Member of the Senedd for Neath 

Following the announcement by Gwenda Thomas, the then-Assembly Member for Neath, that she was planning to stand down at the 2016 National Assembly for Wales election, he was selected to stand as the Labour and Co-operative candidate in Neath constituency in October 2015, following a twinned selection process with Gower constituency.

He was until his selection as the candidate for Neath a trustee and secretary of the social justice charity the Bevan Foundation.

He was elected to the Senedd in May 2016 and was one of the first out gay MSs elected. In November 2017, he was nominated to be the Counsel General for Wales. Before his appointment to government, he sat on the Economy, Skills and Infrastructure committee, Culture, Welsh Language and Communications committee and the External Affairs committee and is the chair of the Co-operative group of AMs.

Counsel General for Wales (2017-2021) 
In November 2017, First Minister of Wales Carwyn Jones undertook a Welsh Government reshuffle. Miles was nominated to the cabinet-level role of Counsel General.

In March 2018, he introduced draft legislation that would create a codified statute book of Welsh law, which would make Wales the first of the home nations to organise its laws in this way. The statute book would be designed to improve accessibility to Welsh Law for both lawyers and the general population.

In the news 
In August 2016, he warned that public disillusionment with politics could threaten devolution in Wales. He expanded on this in an essay for Western Mail where he warned "if we assume the only choice is between complacency and immediate disaster, then we will fail to learn the lessons of Brexit".

In 2016, he entered the Pinc List: The 40 most influential lesbian, gay, bisexual and trans people in Wales for the first time. and was named again on the 2017 Pinc List.

In March 2018, he wrote an article for the Fabian Society in Wales, setting out challenges for the country and seeking to kick-start a debate on the future of Welsh Labour under a new leader. Soon after, he nominated and endorsed Mark Drakeford in the election to succeed Carwyn Jones as Party leader and First Minister.

Other activities
Miles is a member of the Co-operative Party and was elected chair of the Co-operative Group of Senedd Members in 2016. He is also a member of the GMB and Unite trade unions.

Prior to being elected, he had volunteered as a youth mentor with the Young Foundation, and also as an adviser at free legal advice centres. He was an adviser to the Use Your Vote campaign for the 2010 UK general election. He claims his political interests include economic and community development, skills, co-ops and mutuals.

He lives in Alltwen and enjoys film, reading, cooking, hiking and cycling and following local rugby.

References 

Members of the Welsh Assembly Government
Living people
Politicians from Swansea
LGBT members of the Senedd
Gay politicians
Welsh-speaking politicians
Wales MSs 2016–2021
Wales MSs 2021–2026
Year of birth missing (living people)